Joan Carlos Pedroso Brooks (born July 23, 1979 in Las Tunas) is a first baseman for Las Tunas of the Cuban National Series, and the Cuba national baseball team. He was the backup first baseman for Cuba at the 2006 World Baseball Classic, taking second place.

Pedroso hit .353 with 22 home runs during the 2005-06 Cuban National Series.

References

External links
 

1979 births
Living people
2006 World Baseball Classic players
2009 World Baseball Classic players
Cuban baseball players
Leñadores de Las Tunas players
People from Las Tunas (city)
Pan American Games gold medalists for Cuba
Baseball players at the 2003 Pan American Games
Pan American Games medalists in baseball
Medalists at the 2003 Pan American Games